Fields and Streams is a double CD compilation album released by the label Kill Rock Stars on May 7, 2002.

Track list
CD 1
 "Memo From The Desk of the Quails - The Quails
 "Sex Object - Manda & The Marbles
 "Waste of Time" - The Coolies
 "Total Destruction" - Lost Sounds
 "Noon Under The Trees" - The Rock*A*Teens
 "Industrial Skyline" - Industrial Skyline
 "Pick up You"- Dada Swing
 "The Monster" - Stereo Total
 "Caesar's Planet - Gene Defcon
 "Male In Communication" - The Supreme Indifference
 "Blame The Glass Man" - Mecca Normal
 "Leading The Weird" - The Convocation Of...
 "Blight Blues" - Beehive & The Barracudas
 "Through The Swells" - Aislers Set
 "Look At You Now, You're Crying" - Comet Gain
 "The Slip That Hides You" - The Mona Reels
 "Lake Is A Time Bomb" - I'm Being Good
 "What Energy" - Drillboxignition
 "Beautiful Fiction" - Braille Stars
 "For The Win" - The Reputation
 "Still No Sparks" - Delta Dart

CD 2

 "That Girl" - Tender Trap
 "New Scars" - Bangs
 "Imbecile" - Fifth Column
 "Ran Out" - The Dishes
 "Hiding Behind The Moon" - Jeff Hanson
 "Tiger In The Forest" - Mary Timony
 "Modern Things" - Yeah Yeah Yeahs
 "Dawn of Understand" - The Long Goodbye
 "Missy" - Red Monkey
 "Blue Boys" - Carla Bozulich
 "Poseidon's Kiss" - The Process
 "Leg Night" - Erase Errata
 "Love Potions Poison" - Love Life
 "Song of Scorn" - Deerhoof
 "Queen Majesty" - Quasi
 "All The Evils of the World" - The Mooney Suzuki
 "Ode To The Go Cart" - Dirt Bike Annie
 "17" - The Butchies
 "My Assassin" - Lorelei
 "If It's Not Grounded Then It's Not Dead" - Thoroughbred
 "I Don't Know Where I'm Going" - Danielle Howle & The Tantrums
 "Tell Me Once More" - Virginia North & The Them Wranch
 "Knock Loud" - Neko Case
 "Porcelein Throne" - Two Ton Boa

References

External links
Pop Matters Review

2002 compilation albums
Kill Rock Stars compilation albums
Alternative rock compilation albums
Record label compilation albums